Flamme Olympique Football Club de Guinee is a Guinean football club based in Conakry. They play in the Guinean Second Division, which is the second league in Guinean football. They play their home games at 25,000 capacity Stade du 28 Septembre. Its uniform colors are white and blue.

History
The club was founded in 2009. They played in the 2015-2016 Guinée Championnat National season ending at the 12th place.

References

External links
Soccerway
Tables
Globalsportsarchive
Footballdatabase

Football clubs in Guinea
Sport in Conakry